Automotive tires are described by an alphanumeric tire code (in North American English) or tyre code (in Commonwealth English), which is generally molded into the sidewall of the tire. This code specifies the dimensions of the tire, and some of its key limitations, such as load-bearing ability, and maximum speed. Sometimes the inner sidewall contains information not included on the outer sidewall, and vice versa.

The code has grown in complexity over the years, as is evident from the mix of SI and USC units, and ad-hoc extensions to lettering and numbering schemes. New automotive tires frequently have ratings for traction, treadwear, and temperature resistance, all collectively known as the Uniform Tire Quality Grading.

Most tires sizes are given using the ISO metric sizing system. However, some pickup trucks and SUVs use the Light Truck Numeric or Light Truck High Flotation system.

National technical standards regulations

DOT code 
The DOT code is an alphanumeric character sequence molded into the sidewall of the tire and allows the identification of the tire and its age. The code is mandated by the U.S. Department of Transportation but is used worldwide. The DOT code is also useful in identifying tires subject to product recall or at end of life due to age. 

Since 1st February 2021 UK vehicle Regulations do not permit the use of tyres over 10 years old on the front steered axle(s) of heavy goods vehicles, buses and coaches. The ban also applies to all tyres in single configuration on minibuses.   In addition, it is a requirement for all tyres on these vehicles to display a legible date code.

ETRTO and TRA 
The European Tyre and Rim Technical Organisation (ETRTO) and the Tire and Rim Association (TRA) are two organizations that influence national tire standards. The objectives of the ETRTO include aligning national tire and rim standards in Europe. The Tire and Rim Association, formerly known as The Tire and Rim Association of America, Inc., is an American trade organization which standardizes technical standards. In the United States, the Office of Vehicle Safety Compliance, a component of the Department of Transportation, is one of the agencies tasked to enforce the Federal Motor Vehicle Safety Standard (FMVSS). Canada has published tire regulations, such as the Motor Vehicle Tire Safety Regulations SOR 95-148.

E-mark 
All tires sold for road use in Europe after July 1997 must carry an E-mark. The mark itself is either an upper case "E" or lower case "e" – followed by a number in a circle or rectangle, followed by a further number. An (upper case) "E" indicates that the tire is certified to comply with the dimensional, performance and marking requirements of ECE regulation 30. A (lower case) "e" indicates that the tire is certified to comply with the dimensional, performance and marking requirements of Directive 92/23/EEC. The number in the circle or rectangle denotes the country code of the government that granted the type approval. The last number outside the circle or rectangle is the number of the type approval certificate issued for that particular tire size and type.

ISO metric tire codes

The ISO metric tire code consists of a string of letters and numbers, as follows:

 An optional letter (or letters) indicating the intended use or vehicle class for the tire:
 P: Passenger Car
 LT: Light Truck
 ST: Special Trailer
 T: Temporary (restricted usage for "space-saver" spare wheels)
P indicates that the tire is engineered to TRA standards, and absence of a letter indicates that the tire is engineered to ETRTO standards. In practice, the standards of the two organizations have evolved together and are fairly interchangeable, but not fully, since the load index will be different for the same size tire.
 3-digit number: The "nominal section width" of the tire in millimeters; the widest point from both outer edges (side wall to side wall). The tire surface that touches the road usually has a narrower width (called "tread width"). 
 /: Slash character for character separation.
 2- or 3-digit number: The "aspect ratio" of the sidewall height as a percentage of the nominal section width of the tire. If the information is omitted, it is assumed to be 82% (if written, it should be like xxx/82). If the number is larger than 200, then this is the diameter of the entire tire in millimeters.
 An optional letter indicating the speed rating of the tire. Alternatively, the letter may appear at the end, following the load index. If the letter here is Z, indicating a maximum speed in excess of 240 km/h (149 mph), then a more specific letter W or Y may appear after the load index (see speed rating, below).
 An optional letter indicating construction of the fabric carcass of the tire:
 B: bias belt (where the sidewalls are the same material as the tread, leading to a rigid ride)
 D: diagonal
 R: radial 
 if omitted, it is a cross-ply tire
 1- or 2-digit number: Diameter in inches of the rim that the tires are designed to fit. There is the rare exception of metric-diameter tires, such as the use of the 390 size, which in this case would indicate a rim of 390 mm in diameter. Few tires are made to this size currently. The number may be longer where a half-inch size is used, for example many heavy transport trucks now use 22.5-inch tires.
 2- or 3-digit number: Load index; see table below. Some light-truck tires are approved for "dual use", that is they can be run in pairs next to each other. If so, separate load indexes will be specified for single and dual usage. In the example shown in the light-truck tire illustration, the tire has a load index of 114 if used as a single tire, and a load index of 111 if used in a pair. Tires without this designation are unsafe for dual usage.
 1- or 2-digit/letter combo: Speed rating; see table below
 Additional marks: See subheading below.

Light truck (LT) tire codes

Some light truck tires follow the Light Truck Numeric or Light Truck High Flotation systems, indicated by the letters LT at the end instead of the beginning of the sequence, as follows:

 The tire diameter is given for High Flotation tires and omitted from Numeric tires.
 2-digit number: The diameter of the tire in inches.
 x: Separator character.
 3- or 4-digit number: The section width (cross-section) of the tire in inches. If the tire diameter is not given, section widths ending in zero (e.g., 7.00 or 10.50) indicate the aspect ratio of 92%, while section widths not ending in zero (e.g., 7.05 or 10.55) indicate the aspect ratio of 82%. These aspect ratios often vary from today's tire manufacturer specification.
 Construction of the fabric of the tire:
 B: bias belt
 D: diagonal
 R: radial
 2-digit number: Diameter in inches of the rim that this tire is designed to fit.
 LT: Designates that this is a light truck tire.
 Load index and speed rating are sometimes not mandatory for flotation sizes, but must be for any tire approved for street and highway use.
 2- or 3-digit number: Load index; see table below.
 1- or 2-digit/letter combination: Speed rating; see table below.
 Additional marks: see subheading below.
As an example, if a tire size has two sets of numbers (6-12, 5.00-15, 11.2-24), then the first number (5.00-15) is the approximate width in inches, and the second number (5.00-15) is the rim diameter in inches.

If a tire size has three sets of numbers (15x6.00-6, 26x12.00-12, 31x15.50-15), then the first number (26x12.00-12) is the approximate height in inches, the second number (26x12.00-12) is the approximate width in inches, and the third number (26x12.00-12) is the rim diameter in inches.

Load range
The load range letter on light-truck tires indicates their ply rating.

Load index
The load index on a passenger-car tire is a numerical code stipulating the maximum load (mass, or weight) each tire can carry. The two standards vary slightly with the capacity required for different inflation pressures.

While all ETRTO tires of the same load index will have the same maximum load, P-metric tires with the same load index may have different load capacities depending on the tire size. The TRA Inflation Tables must always be consulted when comparing the load capacity of P-Metric tires; the load index alone is not sufficient.

ETRTO produces a Standards Manual (current edition 2010), which contains a number of specifications and tables.

Some of the older letter-code load-range ratings for Light Truck Tires can be found in a chart published by the Goodyear Tire & Rubber Company. For example:

Speed rating
The speed symbol is made up of a single letter or an A with one numeral. It indicates the maximum speed at which the tire can carry a load corresponding to its load index. The testing method consists of pressing the tire against a large diameter metal drum to reflect its appropriate load, and run at ever increasing speeds in 10 km/h (6.2 mph) steps in 10 minute increments until the tire's required speed has been met.

Prior to 1991, tire speed ratings were shown inside the tire size, before the "R" construction type. The available codes were SR (180 km/h, 112 mph), HR (210 km/h, 130 mph), VR (in excess of 210 km/h, 130 mph).

Tires with a speed rating higher than 300 km/h (186 mph) are indicated by a Y in parentheses. The load rating is often included within the parentheses, e.g. (86Y).

In many countries, the law requires that tires must be specified, and fitted, to exceed the maximum speed of the vehicle they are mounted on, with regards to their speed rating code (except for "temporary-use" spare tires). In some parts of the European Union, tires that are not fit for a car's or motorcycle's particular maximum speed are illegal to mount. The sole exception are M+S tires, where a warning sticker stating the allowed maximum speed must be placed within clear sight of the driver inside the vehicle. Some manufacturers will install a speed governor if a vehicle is ordered with tires rated below the vehicle's maximum speed. In some parts of the European Union, e.g. Germany, it is allowed to mount tires with a lower speed rating code if the car manufacturer specifies tires with a very high speed rating in the registration documents and the vehicle will not reach this speed based on insufficient power. In this case it is possible to calculate the appropriate speed rating with a formula.

Tires with a higher speed rating generally have a better grip but a lower tread life, reduced performance in cold weather and reduced driving comfort.

Wear rating

The treadwear is a 3 digit comparative rating. It is part of Uniform Tire Quality Grading standard.

Metric to USC tire conversion chart 
R15

215/75/15 27.7"x 8.5"

225/70/15 27.4"x 8.9"

225/75/15 28.3"x 8.9"

235/75/15 29.0"x 9.3"

245/75/15 29.5"x 9.6"

255/75/15 30.0"x 10.0"

265/75/15 30.6"x 10.4"
 	
R16

205/85/16 29.7"x 8.1"

215/75/16 28.7"x 8.5"

225/70/16 28.4"x 8.9"

225/75/16 29.2"x 8.9"

235/70/16 29.0"x 9.3"

235/85/16 31.7"x 9.3"

245/70/16 29.5"x 9.6"

245/75/16 30.5"x 9.6"

Wheel/rim widths
To determine the allowable range of rim widths for a specific tire size, the TRA Yearbook or the manufacturer's guide should always be consulted for that specific tirethere is no rule of thumb.   Running a tire on a rim size or type not approved by its manufacturer can result in tire failure and a loss of vehicle control.

Additional marks
There are numerous other markings on a typical tire, these may include:

 "*": BMW-Mini original manufacturer fitment
 030908: Approval number of the tire
 "100T": Commonly appears after tire size. Meaning: standard load inflation table (100) & speed rating (T)
 AMx: Aston Martin OE Fitments
 "AO": Audi original manufacturer fitment
 Arrows: Some tread designs are "directional", and designed to perform better when driven in a specific direction. Such tires will have an arrow showing which way the tire should rotate when the vehicle is moving forwards.
 B: Bias belted; tires for motorcycles (Example: 150/70 B 17 69 H)diagonal construction with belt added under the tread
 BSB: Broken serrated band
 BSL: Black serrated letters
 BSW: Black sidewall
 C: Commercial; tires for light trucks (Example: 185 R14 C)
 DOT code: All tires for use in the USA have the DOT code, as required by the Department of Transportation (DOT). It specifies the company, factory, mold, batch, and date of production (two digits for week of the year plus two digits for year; or two digits for week of the year plus one digit for year for tires made prior to 2000). Although not law, some tire manufacturers do not suggest using a "new" tire that has been sitting on the shelf for more than six years (Ford Motor Company) or 10 years (Cooper Tire citing a tire association recommendation). JATMA, the Japanese Automotive Tyre Manufacturers Association recommends that all tires be inspected at five years, and all tires that were manufactured more than ten years previous be replaced.
 E4: Tire approved according to the ECE-regulations, the number indicating the country of approval.
"ELT": Pirelli Elect tyres, specific for electric car 
"J": Jaguar original manufacturer fitment
 LL: Light load; tires for light usage and loads
"M/C": Only for motorcycle fitment
 M+S, or M&S: Mud and snow; A tire that meets the Rubber Manufacturers Association (RMA) and Rubber Association of Canada (RAC) all-season tire definition. These are commonly found on all-season tires, with self-cleaning tread and average traction in muddy or very snowy conditions, and for low temperatures. Spike tires have an additional letter, "E" (M+SE).
 A/T or AT: All Terrain; Designed for all conditions on and off road, master of none
 M+T or M&T: Mud and terrain; Designed to perform in mud or on other terrain that requires additional traction such as on rocks, in deeper snow, and in loose gravel.
 M/T or MT: Mud Terrain; Designed for deep mud and rock crawl
 Made in ...: Country of production
 MO: Original tires for Mercedes-Benz
 MOE: Mercedes-Benz Original Extended mobility (sometimes incorrectly referred to as a Run-flat_tire)
 Mountain snowflake pictograph: Winter passenger and light truck tires that meet the severe snow service requirements of Rubber Manufacturers Association (RMA) and Rubber Association of Canada (RAC).
 N-x: Original tires for Porsche where "x" is a "0" for the first approved in that size, "1" the second, ...
 "NHS": Not highway service
 ORWL: Outlined raised white lettering
 OWL: Outlined white lettering
 RF: Reinforcedfor Euro-metric tires, the term 'reinforced' means the same thing as 'extra load'
 RFT: Run-flat tire; Tires designed for vehicles without spare tires. Reinforced sidewalls allow the tire to be driven "flat" for a distance specified by the manufacturer (usually 50 miles)
 RSC (inside a circle): BMW runflat system component
 RWL: Raised white lettering 
 SFI, or Inner: side facing inward; inside of asymmetric tires
 SFO, or Outer: side facing outward; outside of asymmetric tires
 SL: Standard load; tire for normal usage and loads
 Star: Original tires for BMW
 TL: Tubeless
 TPC: General Motors OE fitments
 TT: Tube-type, tire must be used with an inner-tube
 TWI: Tread wear indicator – a device, such as a triangle or a small Michelin Man icon, located where the tread meets the sidewall, and indicating the location of the raised wear bars in the tire tread channels – TWI is also used to refer to the raised wear bars themselves.
 VSB: Vertical serrated band
 WSW: White sidewall
 XL: extra load; a tire that allows a higher inflation pressure than a standard load tire, which increases the tire's maximum load
 ZP: zero-pressure; Michelin's branding for their run-flat models.

To facilitate proper balancing, most tire manufacturers also mark red circles (uniformity) and/or yellow dots (weight) on the sidewalls of their tires to enable the best possible match-mounting of the tire/wheel assembly.

Tire geometry
When referring to the purely geometrical data, a shortened form of the full notation is used. To take a common example, 195/55R16 would mean that the nominal width of the tire is approximately 195 mm at the widest point, the height of the side-wall of the tire is 55% of the width (107 mm in this example) and that the tire fits  rims. The code gives a direct calculation of the theoretical diameter of the tire. For a size shown as "T/A_W" use (2×T×A/100) + (W×25.4) for a result in millimeters or (T*A/1270)+ W for a result in inches. Take the common example used above; (2×195×55/100)+(16×25.4) = 621 mm or (195×55/1270)+16 = 24.44 inches.

Less commonly used in the US and Europe (but often in Japan for example) is a notation that indicates the full tire diameter instead of the aspect ratio of the side-wall height. To take the same example, a 16-inch rim would have a diameter of 406 mm. Adding twice the tire height (2×107 mm) makes a total 620 mm tire diameter. Hence, a 195/55R16 tire might alternatively be labelled 195/620R16.

Whilst this is theoretically ambiguous, in practice these two notations may easily be distinguished because the height of the side-wall of an automotive tire is typically much less than the width. Hence when the height is expressed as a percentage of the width, it is almost always less than 100% (and certainly less than 200%). Conversely, vehicle tire diameters are always larger than 200 mm. Therefore, if the second number is more than 200, then it is almost certain the Japanese notation is being usedif it is less than 200 then the U.S./European notation is being used.

The diameters referred to above are the theoretical diameter of the tire. The actual diameter of a specific tire size can only be found in the TRA Yearbook or the manufacturer's data books. Note that the tire's cross-section and diameter are always specified when measured on a rim of a specified width; different widths will yield different tire dimensions.

Examples
The tires on a BMW Mini Cooper might be labeled: P195/55R16 85H
 P – these tires are for a passenger vehicle. However 'P' denotes P metric size load and speed rating changes for P tire & non-P tires
 195 – the nominal width of the tire is approximately 195 mm at the widest point
 55 – indicates that the height of the sidewall of the tire is 55% of the width (107 mm)
 R – this is a radial tire
 16 – this tire fits  rims
 H – the speed index, this means the maximum permitted speed, here 210 km/h (130 mph)

The tires on a Hummer H1 might be labeled: 37X12.5R17LT
 12.5 – the tire has a cross section of 
 R – this is a radial tire
 17 – this tire fits  rims
 LT – this is a light truck tire

Historical tire codes

North America 
Prior to 1964, tires were all made to a 90% aspect ratio. Tire size was specified as the tire width in inches and the diameter in inches – for example, 6.50-15.

From 1965 to the early 1970s, tires were made to an 80% aspect ratio. Tire size was again specified by width in inches and diameter in inches. To differentiate from the earlier 90-ratio tires, the decimal point is usually omitted from the width – for example, 685-15 for a tire 6.85 inches wide.

Starting in 1972 tires were specified by load rating, using a letter code. In practice, a higher load rating tire was also a wider tire. In this system a tire had a letter, optionally followed by "R" for radial tires, followed by the aspect ratio, a dash and the diameter – C78-15 or CR78-15 for bias and radial, respectively. Each diameter of rim had a separate sequence of load ratings; thus, a C78-14 and a C78-15 are not the same width. An aspect ratio of 78% was typical for letter-sized tires, although 70% was also common and lower profiles down to 50% were occasionally seen.

See also
 Bicycle tire
 Motorcycle tyre
 Plus sizing
 Speedometer errors induced by variations in tire size.
 Tire manufacturing
 Uniform Tire Quality Grading (UTQG)
 Wheel sizing

References

External links
 List of DOT codes, Complete List of United States Tire DOT codes by manufacturer and plant 
 Tire Safety, United States Department of Transportation
 UK Government bans tyres over 10 years , United Kingdom Department of Transport
 Tire Safety checks, Tyre Safety checks

Tires
Encodings